Sierra de Aracena is the westernmost mountain range of the Sierra Morena, Andalusia, Spain. It is located in the northern part of Huelva Province.

The range is named after the town of Aracena.

Description
The Sierra de Aracena is not very high and its mountains have a gentle, rounded shape. Other notable summits are Cerro de San Cristóbal  and Cerro de Santa Bárbara , the latter located close to Cortegana. The Odiel and Murtigas are the main rivers in the area of the range.

The climate is relatively humid for Andalusian standards and there is a small village in most of the valleys. The undisturbed slopes of the mountains are mostly covered in forest, which is made up of Chestnut, Holm Oak and Cork Oak trees.

Protected areas
The Sierra de Aracena and Picos de Aroche Natural Park is located in the area of the range.

See also
Dehesa
Geography of Spain
Geology of the Iberian Peninsula

References

External links

Parque natural de Sierra de Aracena y Picos de Aroche

Sierra Morena
Mountain ranges of Andalusia